Banu Hudhayl is an Arab tribe that originated in the Hejaz. The tribe mainly inhabits Saudi Arabia, Tunisia, Jordan and Egypt. The tribe was one of the tribes in contact with the prophet Muhammad and they are known throughout history for their talented poets and intellectuals.

Ancestry 
The tribe traces a genealogical history backwards from their eponymous ancestor to Adam:

Hudhayl son of Madrakah son of Ilyas (Elijah) son of Madher son of Nazar son of Ma'ad son of Adnan son of Add son of Send son of Napyot son of Ishmael  son of Abraham son of Azar (Terah) son of Nahor son of Srooj son of Ra'o son of Phaleg  son of Aber son of Shaleh son of Arpheckshad son of Sam son of Noah son of Lamek son of Motoshaleh son of Edres (Enoch) son of Yared son of Mehlaiel son of Qenan son of Anosh son of Seth son of Adam

Branches 

Banu Hudhayl are divided in two branches: Lihyan ibn Hudhayl and Sa'ad ibn Hudhayl.

Lihyan ibn Hudhayl 
The descendants of Lihyan ibn Hudhayl who founded the Arab kingdom of Lihyan, and presently live in the desert between Mecca and Ta'if. They are now divided into two clans:

Mohrez, subdivided into
Alhosianat
Aldhban
Almosah
Marer, subdivided into
Albatahah
Almasaibah
Alnegimah
Aloodah

Sa'ad ibn Hudhayl 
There are presently four descendent clans of Sa'ad ibn Hudhayl:
Beni, subdivided into
Banu Omair
Banu Mas'od
Banu Mohaiya
Banu Nobatah
Fleet, subdivided into
Al-Hatareshah
Al-Afran
Al-Eyad
Hudhayl Albogom
Banu Reshah
Al-Matarefah
Al-Sa'iedah
Al-Moatan
Zohair, subdivided into
Al-Srawnah
Da'ad
Sahelah
Zolayfah.
Jamil, subdivided into
Alqarh
Al-Mahmud
Al-Kedwa (also known as Alkedawi)
Al-Sawalima
Al-Kabakiba 
Beni kaeb
Bani yas
Bani zayd
Banu ziad
Al-Hasasana
Al zalifa
Alshaeabin
Altalahat
Al khalid
Albaqla
Al hamid
Al zaydan
Sahila
Aleabida
Aljawabira
Alnnjb

Arabian tribes that interacted with Muhammad 

 Banu Kinanah
 Quraish
 Banu Sulaym
 Banu Tamim
 Bani Asad
 Banu Thaqif
 Hawazin
 Ghatafan

Known Members 
 Abdullah bin Masud, a companion of Prophet Muhammad
 Al-Masudi, Abbasid historian 
 Adel Al-Jubeir, Saudi diplomat and Minister of State for Foreign Affairs
 Ubayd-Allah ibn Abd-Allah, Hadith narrator 
 Sinan ibn Salamah ibn Mohbik, Umayyad general and governor of Sindh
 Aboul-Qacem Echebbi, Tunisian Poet 
 Abū Dhuʾayb al-Hudhalī, poet contemporary of the Prophet Muhammad

Notes

Further reading 
 History Ibn Khaldun
 History Ibn al-Athir
 History Ibn Hisham
 History Al-Hamdani
 History Ibn Ishaq
 Kinship and marriage in early Arabia by \ Smith W. Robertson
 A universal history, from the earliest accounts to the present time by \ Universal
 The Koran, Commonly Called the Alcoran of Mohammed by George Sale, Savary
 A Short History of the Arabs by \ Francesco Gabrieli, Salvator Attanasio
 The March from Medina by \ John Walter Jandora
 Muhammad by \ Muhammad Zafrulla Khan
 Mohammed and the Rise of Islam by \ D. S. Margoliouth
 History of Arabia, Ancient and Modern by \ Andrew Crichton

External links 
 https://web.archive.org/web/20080316215832/http://www.hathailly.com/vb/showthread.php?t=11324
 http://lahyan.net/vb/archive/index.php/t-24.html
 http://www.tmeme.com/vb/showthread.php?t=342
 https://web.archive.org/web/20080403064904/http://www.thearabhistory.com/mudar
 Arabian tribes that interacted with Muhammad
 http://sirah.al-islam.com/SearchDisp.asp?ID=113&SearchText=هذيل%20بن%20مدركة&SearchType=root&Scope=all&Offset=20&SearchLevel=QBE
 http://sirah.al-islam.com/SearchDisp.asp?ID=1672&SearchText=هذيل%20بن%20مدركة&SearchType=root&Scope=all&Offset=20&SearchLevel=QBE
 https://web.archive.org/web/20100222125145/http://sirah.al-islam.com/tree.asp?ID=1&t=book2
 https://web.archive.org/web/20080309174242/http://sirah.al-islam.com/Display.asp?f=rwd1012
 https://web.archive.org/web/20100122083326/http://sirah.al-islam.com/Display.asp?f=rwd1014
 https://books.google.com/books?id=baw9AAAAIAAJ&pg=PA155&dq=Lihyan&lr=
 https://books.google.com/books?id=CR9iAgUwmTEC&pg=PA338&dq=Lihyan&lr=
 https://books.google.com/books?id=SLvnnT31Du0C&pg=PA230&lpg=PA230&dq=%22Hodhail%22&source=bl&ots=GkklnIdE4X&sig=Kzt-WdMasrCFAZ9jPzm6dC2TGtU&hl=ar&sa=X&oi=book_result&resnum=6&ct=result#PPA230,M1
 http://www.familytreedna.com/public/J1arabproject/default.aspx
 https://web.archive.org/web/20090208095900/http://whitebook.com/p_1_en.htm

 
Tribes of Arabia
Semitic-speaking peoples
Mudar
History of Saudi Arabia
Ethnic groups in the Middle East
Bedouin groups
History of the Arabian Peninsula
Bedouins in Saudi Arabia
Tribes of Saudi Arabia
Arab tribes in Algeria
Arab tribes in Morocco
Tribes of Jordan
Tribes